Glue (stylized as GLUE) is the third full-length studio album by British rock band Boston Manor. Released on May 1, 2020 on Pure Noise Records.

Background
On February 5, 2020, Boston Manor announced their third studio album, Glue, to be released on May 1. Two days later on February 7, they released the album's lead single, "Everything Is Ordinary".

Chart performance

Glue debuted at number 97 on the UK Albums Chart.

Critical reception

Glue was met with critical acclaim. At Metacritic, which assigns a normalized rating out of 100 to reviews from professional publications, the album received an average score of 90, based on 5 reviews. AnyDecentMusic? gave it 7.7 out of 10, based on their assessment of the critical consensus. At Album of the Year the album received an average score of 83 out of 100.

Track listing

Personnel
Henry Cox - lead vocals
Mike Cunniff - lead guitar
Dan Cunniff - bass, backing vocals
Ash Wilson - rhythm guitar, backing vocals
Jordan Pugh - drums, percussion

References

Boston Manor albums
Pure Noise Records albums
2020 albums